Parkgate railway station was a station on the single track Hooton to West Kirby branch of the Birkenhead Railway, on the Wirral Peninsula, Cheshire, England. The station served the village of Parkgate.

History
The Birkenhead Railway, owned jointly by the Great Western Railway (GWR) and London and North Western Railway (LNWR), opened a branch line from Hooton to Parkgate on 1 October 1866. An extension to West Kirby was completed twenty years later. The original station at Parkgate was a temporary wooden structure as a possible future extension to West Kirby had been taken into consideration. For this purpose, a second station was built, which opened on 19 April 1886. The old station buildings were retained as a goods yard.

Closure
Once motor transport reached the area passenger numbers dwindled and on 17 September 1956 the station was closed to passengers. The track continued to be used for freight transportation and driver training for another six years, closing on 7 May 1962. The tracks were lifted two years later. The station buildings have been demolished, although the stationmaster's house remains as a private residence.

Wirral Country Park
The route became the Wirral Way footpath and part of Wirral Country Park in 1973, which was the first such designated site in Britain.

References

Further reading

External links

Disused railway stations in Cheshire
Former Birkenhead Railway stations
Railway stations in Great Britain opened in 1866
Railway stations in Great Britain closed in 1956
1866 establishments in England